Đà Bắc is a township and capital of Đà Bắc District, Hòa Bình Province, Vietnam.

References

Populated places in Hòa Bình province
District capitals in Vietnam
Townships in Vietnam